Schwimmer Airfield (also known as 14-Mile Drome) is a former World War II airfield near Port Moresby, Papua New Guinea. It was part of a multiple-airfield complex in the Port Moresby area, located north of the Laloki River.

The airfield was known as 14 mile for its distance from Port Moresby, and also known as 'Laloki' or 'Lakoki Drome' for the river to the northwest of the airstrip.  It was officially renamed "Schwimmer Airfield" on November 10, 1942, in honor of Charles Schwimmer, lost in P-39D 41-6956 intercepting Japanese aircraft over Port Moresby.

History
Around October 1942 it was re-surfaced with Marston Matting. No revetments were built but the taxiway and parking areas were dispersed to the north of the runway in a semicircle. The crews lived in pyramid tents  from the strip in scrub trees.

Many units were rotated in and out of the airfield during its use.   Major units assigned were:

 13th Bombardment Squadron (3d Bombardment Group), B-25 Mitchells
 9th Fighter Squadron (49th Fighter Group), P-40 Warhawk
 39th Fighter Squadron (35th Fighter Group). P-39 Airacobras; P-38 Lightnings

The airfield was closed after the war and today there is little evidence remaining of the facility.  Houses have been built along much of the former runway area. The rest is overgrown and abandoned. Some wartime debris litter the area. Bomb storage bays are visible from the road.

See also

 USAAF in the Southwest Pacific
 Port Moresby Airfield Complex

 Kila Airfield (3 Mile Drome)
 Wards Airfield (5 Mile Drome)
 Jackson Airfield (7 Mile Drome)
 Berry Airfield (12 Mile Drome)

 Durand Airfield (17 Mile Drome)
 Rogers (Rarona) Airfield (30 Mile Drome)
 Fishermans (Daugo Island) Airfield

References

 Maurer, Maurer (1983). Air Force Combat Units Of World War II. Maxwell AFB, Alabama: Office of Air Force History. .
 www.pacificwrecks.com

External links

Airfields of the United States Army Air Forces in Papua New Guinea
Airports established in 1942
1942 establishments in the Territory of Papua